Sacred Heart Senior Secondary School is a convent school of Dharamshala, situated at Sidhpur Dari Dharamshala, in Kangra district, Himachal Pradesh, India. Built in 1969, it is located close to the Dhauladhar mountain range.  The school is a unit of the Sisters of Charity of Jesus and Mary, which has branches in  five continents.

History

The school is a co-educational institution open to students irrespective of caste, colour, creed and religion. The Indo-Pakistan war of 1965 affected the administrative set up of the Congregation of the Sisters of Charity of Jesus and Mary in India. The then Provincial mother Declan was contemplating opening new avenues for apostolic activities. At that time some military officials contacted Mother Declan, asking for sisters to take over the Garrison school, a small primary school at Yol military camp in Himachal Pradesh. A military bungalow was given to the sisters as residence and several similar bungalows nearby to be used for the school, which was then run by an elderly lady.

On 26 August 1966, five sisters arrived in Yol (Srs. Giovanni, Vincentia, Susan, Nirmala and Justina). In November 1966 the community was officially established with Sr. Corneliave as its first superior and Srs. Vincentia, Susan, Silvia, and Lucia as founding members.

By January 1967 the Primary Garrison School with 150 students was taken over by the sisters and it was rechristened "Sacred Heart Garrison School". It was a co-educational school with the arrival of the 4th Mountain Division of the army under the commands of Major General Rai, the number of students increased, the bungalows could not accommodate them. So more classrooms were needed. After searching a new location between Dharamsala and Yol, in Sidhpur, was found. The new school building consisted of eight class rooms and all the facilities for the boarding school. The classes started in Sidhpur in 1969. The convent in Sidhpur was built later.

The first prize distribution function was held at the school in Yol on 5 December 1969. Shri Choudhary Hari Ram, the then Transport minister of Himachal Pradesh was Chief Guest. In March 1970, the late Dr. Y.S. Parmar, the then Chief minister of H.P. formally inaugurated Sacred Heart High School, Sidhpur with classes Primary to I.S.C (+2).

The boarding house was closed in 1985.

Initially started as a purely girls school, it became co-educational in the early seventies on the request of the locals, as it was the only convent.

Inter-school achievements (2015) 
The school had achieved the first position in the model presentation at the Central University of Himachal Pradesh, Shahpur on the Earth Day, on 22 April 2015. The model presented was an earthquake-resistant structure inspired by the Shinbashira concept used in the Japanese Pagoda Temples.

Alumni
Amrita Chaudhry

References

External links

Catholic schools in India
Primary schools in India
High schools and secondary schools in Himachal Pradesh
Christian schools in Himachal Pradesh
Education in Dharamshala
Schools in Kangra district